Daniel Patrick Schock (December 30, 1948 — June 15, 2017) was a Canadian professional ice hockey player who played 20 regular season games and one playoff game in the National Hockey League. He played with the Boston Bruins and Philadelphia Flyers. He won the Stanley Cup in 1970 with the Boston Bruins while playing one game in the playoffs, and had his name engraved on the Stanley Cup. Danny is the brother of Ron Schock.

Career statistics

Regular season and playoffs

External links
 

1948 births
2017 deaths
Boston Bruins draft picks
Boston Bruins players
Canadian expatriate ice hockey players in the United States
Canadian ice hockey left wingers
Estevan Bruins players
Greensboro Generals (SHL) players
Ice hockey people from Ontario
National Hockey League first-round draft picks
Oklahoma City Blazers (1965–1977) players
People from Thunder Bay District
Philadelphia Flyers players
Quebec Aces (AHL) players
Richmond Robins players
Richmond Wildcats players
Salt Lake Golden Eagles (WHL) players
Stanley Cup champions
Syracuse Blazers players